All-trans-8'-apo-beta-carotenal 15,15'-oxygenase (Diox1, ACO, 8'-apo-beta-carotenal 15,15'-oxygenase) is an enzyme with systematic name all-trans-8'-apo-beta-carotenal:oxygen 15,15'-oxidoreductase (bond-cleaving). This enzyme catalyses the following chemical reaction

 all-trans-8'-apo-beta-carotenal + O2  all-trans-retinal + (2E,4E,6E)-2,6-dimethylocta-2,4,6-trienedial

All-trans-8'-apo-beta-carotenal 15,15'-oxygenase contains an Fe2+-4His arrangement.

References

External links 
 

EC 1.14.99